Segal, and its variants including Sagal, Segel, Sigal or Siegel, is a family name which is primarily Ashkenazi Jewish.

The name is said to be derived from Hebrew segan leviyyah (assistant to the Levites) although a minority of sources claim that "Segal" is instead a Hebrew abbreviation for segan le-kehunah (assistant to the Cohen – assistant to the priest).

People
Notable people with the surname include:

 Abe Segal (1930–2016), South African tennis player
Alan F. Segal (1945–2011), American Professor of Jewish Studies
Allan Segal (1941–2012), British documentary filmmaker
Alvin Segal (born 1933), American-Canadian businessman and philanthropist
 Anna Segal (born 1986), Australian Olympic freestyle skier and 2-time world champion
Anthony Segal (born 1944), British physician/scientist
Brandon Segal (born 1983), Canadian ice hockey player
Charles Segal (1936–2002), American historian and classicist
Dan Segal (born 1947), British mathematician
David HaLevi Segal (1586–1667), Polish rabbi and Halakhist
David Segal (politician), Member of the Rhode Island House of Representatives and candidate for Rhode Island's 1st congressional district
Erich Segal (1937–2010), American author, screenwriter, and educator
Ester H. Segal, Israeli nanotechnologist and educator
Francesca Segal (born 1980), British author and journalist
Gabriel Segal (philosopher) (born 1959), British professor, philosopher and author
George Segal (artist) (1924–2000), American sculptor and painter
George Segal (1934–2021), American actor
Gloria Segal (1928–1993), American politician
Graeme Segal (born 1941), Australian mathematician
Hugh Segal (born 1950), Canadian Senator and co-chair of the Conservative Party of Canada campaign in the 2006 Federal Election
Irving Segal (1918–1998), American mathematician
Jack Segal (1918–2005), American composer
Jakob Segal (1911–1995), biology professor at the Humboldt University of Berlin
Jeffrey Segal (1920–2015), British actor
Joel Segal, American liberal activist
Jonathan Segal (actor), (1953–1999), American television actor
Judah Segal (1912–2003), British professor of Semitics
Kate Segal (born 1975), Member of the Michigan House of Representatives from the 62nd district
Katey Sagal (born 1953), American actress and singer-songwriter
Lore Segal (born 1928), Austrian-American novelist and Pulitzer Prize finalist
Marilyn Segal, American psychologist
Michael Segal (born 1972), Israeli scholar of computer science
Moshe Zvi Segal (1875–1968), Israeli rabbi
Nachum Segal, Jewish American DJ
Nancy L. Segal (born 1951), American evolutionary psychologist and behavioral geneticist
Ned Segal (born ), American business executive 
Peter Sagal (born 1965), American radio host
Peter Segal (born 1962), American film director
Philip Segal (born 1958), English-born television producer
Richard D. Segal, American businessman and art collector
Ronald Segal (1932–2008), South African writer and activist
Samuel Segal (1902–1985), British doctor and politician
Sara Segal, later Sophia Karp (1861–1904), the first professional Yiddish theater actress                                                                          
Steve Segal, American animator
Stephen H. Segal, American science fiction writer and editor
Sydney Segal, American female contestant on reality show Survivor 41#
Tobias Segal, American actor
Yuval Segal (born 1971), Israeli actor and comedian
Walter Segal (1907–1985), German-born Romanian architect working in England, who developed a system of self-build housing
Zindel Segal (born 1956), Ukrainian-Canadian cognitive psychologist, one of the founders of mindfulness-based cognitive therapy

Mathematical concepts
Gelfand–Naimark–Segal construction
Segal space

Other uses
Segal–Cover score, attempt to measure relative liberalism or conservatism of U.S. Supreme Court Justices

See also
Chagall (disambiguation)
Siegel
Segel
Sigel (disambiguation)

References

External links 
 , website of the Segal association

Surnames
Jewish surnames
Levite surnames
Yiddish-language surnames

ja:シーガル